Splendrillia arga is a species of sea snail, a marine gastropod mollusk in the family Drilliidae.

Description
The length of the shell attains 9.3 mm, its diameter 3.2 mm.

Distribution
This species occurs in the demersal zone of the Pacific Ocean between Mexico and Panama.

References
Notes

Sources
  Tucker, J.K. 2004 Catalog of recent and fossil turrids (Mollusca: Gastropoda). Zootaxa 682:1–1295.
  McLean & Poorman, 1971. New species of Tropical Eastern Pacific Turridae; The Veliger, 14, 89–113

External links
 

arga
Gastropods described in 1971